Acinopterus is a genus of leafhoppers in the family Cicadellidae. There are more than 30 described species in Acinopterus. The members of Acinopterus are widely distributed across North and South America. Acinopterus is the type genus of the tribe Acinopterini.

Species
These 37 species belong to the genus Acinopterus:

 Acinopterus acuminatus Van Duzee, 1892
 Acinopterus angulatus Lawson, 1922 (angulate leafhopper)
 Acinopterus aridellus
 Acinopterus bakeri Lawson
 Acinopterus brunneus Ball, 1903
 Acinopterus centralis Freytag, 1993
 Acinopterus corniger Beamer & Lawson, 1938
 Acinopterus cornigera Beamer & Lawson
 Acinopterus elongatus Lawson
 Acinopterus excavatus Beamer & Lawson, 1938
 Acinopterus fuscifrons Lawson, 1931
 Acinopterus gentilis Berg, 1879
 Acinopterus godoyae Freytag, 1993
 Acinopterus igualanus Linnavuori & DeLong, 1977
 Acinopterus inflatus Lawson, 1927
 Acinopterus inornatus Baker, 1895
 Acinopterus latus Lawson
 Acinopterus lawsoni Linnavuori & DeLong, 1977
 Acinopterus molestus Beamer & Lawton, 1938
 Acinopterus morongoensis Knull, 1944
 Acinopterus obtutus Lawson, 1922
 Acinopterus pallidus Lawson
 Acinopterus parallelus Beamer, 1944
 Acinopterus parvulus Lawson
 Acinopterus pennatus Beamer & Lawson, 1938
 Acinopterus perdicoensis Linnavuori & DeLong, 1977
 Acinopterus plenus Beamer & Lawson, 1938
 Acinopterus productus Lawson, 1922
 Acinopterus pulchellus Lawson, 1927
 Acinopterus quadricornis Beamer & Lawson, 1938
 Acinopterus reticulatus Beamer & Lawson
 Acinopterus rileyi Lawson, 1927
 Acinopterus rostratus Beamer & Lawson, 1938
 Acinopterus rubicundus Beamer & Lawson, 1938
 Acinopterus rubrus Lawson, 1931
 Acinopterus smidtii Turton, 1802
 Acinopterus viridis Ball, 1903

References

Further reading

 

Acinopterini
Cicadellidae genera
Articles created by Qbugbot